Peggy Ahwesh (born 1954 in Canonsburg, Pennsylvania) is an American experimental filmmaker and video artist. She received her B.F.A. at Antioch College. A bricoleur who has created both narrative works and documentaries, some projects are scripted and others incorporate improvised performance. She makes use of sync sound, found footage, digital animation, and Pixelvision video. Her work is primarily an investigation of cultural identity and the role of the subject in various genres. Her interests include genre; women, sexuality and feminism; reenactment; and artists' books. Her works have been shown worldwide, including in San Francisco, New York, Barcelona, London, Toronto, Rotterdam, and Créteil, France. Starting in 1990, she has taught at Bard College as a Professor of Film and Electronic Arts. Her teaching interests include: experimental media, history of the non-fiction film, and women in film.

Career
Peggy Ahwesh went to Antioch College, where she became enamored with the works of radical artists and filmmakers like Paul Sharits, Tony Conrad, Carolee Schneeman and Joyce Wieland. After college, she returned to her hometown of Cannonsburg, where she began her film career working on Super 8 film. She thought Cannonsburg was a small industrial town that offered a freeing artistic feel. During the 1970s, she became involved with the local punk rock scene, and would create short films with her friends documenting the punk bands.

Following this, she began working at The Mattress Factory—a large art warehouse in Pittsburgh—where she began her own film series. One of her first guests was filmmaker George A. Romero. She began to show his work locally and befriended Romero's crew. By 1982, she began to work her way into the industry as a production assistant on feature films on Romero's films. There, she met good friends Natalka Voslakov and Maggie Strosser. Ahwesh claims Romero to be a huge influence on her as he was knowledgeable on race, gender, and independent films. Soon, Ahwesh joined Pittsburgh Filmmakers as a programmer. She also wrote grants and collaborated with local clubs and the University of Pittsburgh. In 1980, Ahwesh did a big group show of local filmmakers. She liked the idea of group shows because they got everybody involved.

By 1983, she created what is known as The Pittsburgh Trilogy—three films made back to back that documented the lives of her friends during the summer of 1983. Ahwesh claims the three films: Verite Opera (1983), Paranormal Intelligence (1983), and Nostalgia for Paradise (1983) are not diary films, narratives or documentaries but rather "portraits" of her friends. The three films helped explore Ahwesh's interest in her friends and helped answer the questions of what kind of relationship does one have with a person, what kind of relationship does the camera have with a person, how do you shoot positive and negative space and what is it about people that makes them interesting? Ahwesh was not aware that she had copied the name for the trilogy from another experimental filmmaker, Stan Brakhage.

In 1990, she received recognition for her film The Deadman (1990) due to her use of 16mm opposed to her favored Super 8. In 2001, Ahwesh took her art to another level by using footage from the game Tomb Raider in her experimental piece She Puppet (2001), which explored female identity and the evolution of technology.
In 1990, she began teaching at Bard College. Currently, she is Professor Emeritus of Film and Electronic Art while pursuing her own projects.

Awards
 Bard College Research Grant (2002)
 Creative Capital (2002)
 Alpert Award in the Arts, Cal Arts/Alpert Foundation (2000)
 New York Foundation for the Arts (NYFA), Video Fellowship (2000)
 New York Foundation for the Arts (NYSCA), Film/Video Fellowship (1993) (2002)
 New York Foundation for the Arts (NYSCA), Distribution Grant (1992) (1999)
 Guggenheim Foundation, Fellowship (1996)
 Jerome Foundation, Film Project Award (1990) (1998)
 Art Matters (1992) (1995)

Selected filmography
 Bethlehem (2009) 8 minutes, color, video
 The Third Body (2008) 9 min, color, video
 Warm Objects (2007) 5 min, color, video
 Beirut Outtakes (2007) 7 min, video
 Dedication (2006) 4 min, color, video
 Certain Women, with Bobby Abate, (2004) 72 min, video
 The Star Eaters (2003), 24 min, video
 She Puppet (2001), 15 min, color, video
 Heaven's Gate (2000–01), 3:53 min, b&w, video
 73 Suspect Words & Heaven's Gate (1999–2000) 8 min, video
 Nocturne (1998) 30 min, b&w, 16 mm film
 The Vision Machine (1997), 20 min, b&w and color, 16 mm film
 Magnetism, Attraction and Repulsion, Deep Sleep, Auto Suggestion, Animal Magnetism, Mesmerism, and Fascination (1996), 16 min, color, video
 Trick Film (1996), 5 min, 16mm film
 The Color of Love (1994), 10 min, color, sound, 16 mm film
 The Scary Movie (1993), 9 min, b&w, sound, 16 mm film
 Strange Weather, with Margie Strosser, (1993) 50 min, video, b&w
 Martina's Playhouse (1989), 20 min, color, sound, Super 8 film
 The Deadman, with Keith Sanborn, (1990), 39 min, b&w, 16 mm film
 I Ride a Pony Named Flame (1988) 5 min, video
 Philosophy in the Bedroom (1987) 10 min, Super 8 film
 From Romance to Ritual (1985) 10 min, Super 8 film
 The Fragments Project (1985–1995), 50 min, color, sound, Super 8 film
 Ode to the New Pre-History (1984–1987) 25 min, Super 8 film
 Pittsburgh Trilogy (1983) 50 min, Super 8 film

Selected screenings and exhibitions
 2021: One Person Shows
 Vision Machines; Spike Island, Bristol, UK
 2019: One Person Shows
 Cleave; Microscope Gallery, Brooklyn, NY
 2014-2015: One Person Shows
 Kissing Point; Microscope Gallery, Brooklyn, NY
 2006: One Person Shows
 Museo Nacional Centro de Arte Reina Sofia; Madrid, Spain (retrospective)
 American University of Beirut; Beirut, Lebanon
 Anthology Film Archives; NY, NY (theatrical run, Certain Women)
 "Ahwesh: Personal Archive Show", Anthology Film Archives; NY, NY
 2006. Selected Festivals. Group Shows
 "Stitch & Split: Selves & Territories in Science Fiction", Fundació Antoni Tàpies; Barcelona, Spain
 The Württembergischer Kunstverein; Stuttgart, Germany
 IAMNOWHERE, Center for Curatorial Studies, Bard College; Annandale, NY
 "The Imagination of Disaster", Ocularis; Brooklyn, NY
 Silverlake Film Festival: MP4 Fest, Los Angeles, CA
 Copilandia: una Isla Libre de Propiedad Intellectual, Seville, Spain (traveled)
 "Art as a Form of Conversation", Dashanzi Arts Festival, Beijing, China (traveled)
 Centre de Cultura Contemporania, Barcelona, Spain
 "Games People Play", Pacific Film Archive, Berkeley, CA
 Foundation for Art, Culture & Technology, Liverpool, UK
 "Breaking the Game", www.workspace-unlimited.org (on-line symposium)
 2005. One Person Shows
 Wisconsin Film Festival; Madison, WI (retrospective)
 femme totale; Dortmund, Germany (screening & panel)
 University of Chicago, Film Studies Center; Chicago, Il
 2005. Selected Festivals. Group Shows
 Pompidou Center; Paris, France MIX: NY
 Lesbian & Gay Experimental Film Festival; NY, NY
 "Jerome, Hill & Foundation", MoMA; NY, NY (screening & panel)
 The Childhood Show, Magic Lantern Cinema; Providence, RI
 "Brides of Frankenstein", San Jose Museum of Art; San Jose, CA
 2004. One Person Shows
 Rotterdam International Film Festival; Rotterdam, The Netherlands
 The Museum of Modern Art, Mediascope; New York, NY
 New York Underground Film Festival; New York, NY (traveled)
 Institute for Studies in the Arts, ASU; Tempe, Arizona
 "Videos by Peggy Ahwesh", Terrorvision Show, Exit Art; New York, NY
 Redcat Theater, California Institute for the Arts; Valencia, CA (residency)
 Chicago Underground Film Festival; Chicago, IL
 Brighton Cinematheque; Brighton, UK
 Zinebi 46 Festival; Bilbao, Spain
 Cinematexas 10; Austin, TX
 Union Theater, University of Wisconsin-Milwaukee; Milwaukee, WI
 2004. Selected Festivals. Group Shows
 "Visions of Excess" Press Play Video, Carnegie Mellon University; Pittsburgh, PA
 "The Walking Picture Palace", Anthology Film Archives; NY, NY
 New York Video Festival; Film Society of Lincoln Center; New York, NY
 European Media Arts Festival; Osnabruck, Germany
 "Acting Out", York University; Toronto, Canada
 Festival of Contemporary Arts: City of Women; Ljubljana, Slovenia
 "Lookalike: Barbie Lolita Lara Croft", Nederlands Fotomuseum; Amsterdam, The Netherlands
 2003. One Person Shows
 Mills College Art Museum, Contemporary Exhibitions; Oakland, CA
 Pixil This 12; LA, CA Princeton University; Princeton, NJ
 Binghamton University; Binghamton, NY
 2003. Selected Festivals. Group Shows
 Image Forum Festival; Tokyo, Japan (traveled)
 Russian National Contemporary Art Center, Experimental Videos from US; Moscow, Russia (traveled)
 "I Wonder About You and Through You: Women Respond to Technology with Wonder and Caution"; Portland, OR
 Bellevue Arts Museum; Seattle, WA
 Moscow International Film Fest; Russia (traveled)
 MoMA, Stand-by retrospective program; NY
 Fundacio Antoni Tàpies, "Stitch and Split: Selves and Territories in Science Fiction"; Barcelona, Spain
 "Mirror, Mirror", Surrey Institute of Art & Design; London, UK
 2002. One Person Shows
 "Sandbox Antics, Tantrums, and Tourist Attractions", Pittsburgh Filmmakers and Carnegie Mellon University; Pittsburgh, PA (retrospective)
 New Collaborations: Electronic Intersections, Institute for Electronic Arts, School of Art and Design, Alfred University; Alfred, NY (conference)
 2002. Selected Festivals. Group Shows
 2002 Biennial Exhibition, Whitney Museum of American Art, NY
 Rotterdam International Film Festival; Rotterdam, The Netherlands
 Image Forum Festival; Tokyo, Japan (traveled)
 Animations, P.S.1/MoMA; Queens, NY (traveled Kunst Werke Berlin)
 Electromediascope, The Nelson-Atkins Museum of Art, Department of Modern and Contemporary Art; Kansas City, MO
 Dangerous Beauty: The Videos, Jewish Community Center; NY
 Verbindingen/Jonctions Festival 6; Brussels, Belgium
 Machine Love, Vidarte 2002 International Festival; Mexico City, Mexico
 FILMS THAT RISE TO THE SURFACE (OF CLARIFIED BUTTER); Balagan, Boston
 "Catastrophe & Spectacle", Oberhausen Film Festival; Oberhausen, Germany
 2001. One Person Shows
 California Institute for the Arts; Valencia, CA (screenings/residency)
 Sam Spiegel Film School; Jerusalem, Israel (screenings/residency)
 The Jerusalem Cinematheque; Jerusalem, Israel
 Women Direct, Ithaca College; Ithaca, NY (screening & conference)
 "All the Girls with Cameras in Their Heads", Cinematexas 6; Austin, TX (retrospective)
 2001. Selected Festivals. Group Shows
 Laracroft:ism, On Female Heroines, Nomads and Residents panel; NY
 "Imitation of Kiss", Warhol Museum; Pittsburgh, PA (traveled)
 Three Women from Brooklyn, Ocularis; Brooklyn, NY
 New York Video Festival, Film Society of Lincoln Center; NY
 Pandaemonium: Festival of the Moving Image; London, UK (traveled)
 Some Kind of Loving, Joanie4Jackie (curator Astria Suparak) (traveled)
 The Stained Handkerchief, Maastricht; The Netherlands (traveled)
 To Make it Better Every Time: Internal Security; Munich, Germany (traveled)
 "All is Fair in Love and War"; Amsterdam, The Netherlands (traveled)
 2000. One Person Shows
 The Flaherty Seminar, International Film Seminars, NY (curator Kathy Geritz)
 The American Century: Art & Culture (1950–2000), Whitney Museum of American Art; New York, NY
 2000. Selected Festivals. Group Shows
 The End: An Independent View of Contemporary Culture ('82-'00),Exit Art; NY
 Science is Fiction: The Films of Jean Painleve, MoMA; NY
 "The Color of Ritual, The Color of Thought", Whitney Museum of American Art; NY
 World Wide Video Festival; Amsterdam, The Netherlands
 DUMBO Arts Festival; Brooklyn, NY Cinematexas 5, Austin, TX
 The Trinity Show, Ocularis; Brooklyn, NY (curator Jim Browne)
 1999. One Person Shows
 The Guggenheim Museum; NY (lecture) LUX Cinema; London, England (retrospective)
 Warhol's Grave, The Balie Theater; Amsterdam, The Netherlands
 The Grand Illusion Cinema/Wiggly World; Seattle, WA
 Yerba Buena Center for the Arts; SF, CA (residency/retrospective)
 Splice This!, S8mm Film Festival; Toronto, Canada (retrospective)
 Three by Peggy Ahwesh, Anthology Film Archives; NY
 Nocturne and What!, Pacific Film Archive; Berkeley, CA
 Criminal Sexuality: The Films of Peggy Ahwesh, Pacific Cinematheque; Vancouver, Canada (retrospective)
 1999. Selected Festivals. Group Shows
 Rotterdam International Film Festival; The Netherlands
 European Media Art Festival; Osnabruck, Germany
 GirlsKnifeTheoryGore, Cornershop; Buffalo, NY
 Dark Shadows: Recent Avant-Garde Films, Chicago Filmmakers; Chicago, IL
 1998. One Person Shows
 S8mm Films by Peggy Ahwesh, MoMA; NY
 The Secret Charts, Jonctions Festival; Brussels, Belgium (installation w Amy Sillman)
 Girls Beware! (reprise), Jonctions Festival 2; Brussels, Belgium
 1998. Selected Festivals. Group Shows
 Big As Life: An American History of 8mm Films, MoMA; NY
 Pandaemonium: Festival of the Moving Image; London, England
 Lo-Fi Baroque, Threadwaxing Space; New York, NY
 Reel New York, WNET/Ch13 TV; New York, NY
 MadCat Women's Film Festival; San Francisco, CA
 New York Film Festival, Film Society of Lincoln Center; NY (traveled)
 1997. One Person Shows
 Girls Beware!, New American Film & Video Series, Whitney Museum of American Art; NY (retrospective)
 Subtle Subversions: The Films of Peggy Ahwesh, Chicago Filmmakers; Chicago, IL
 Low Tech, Museu d'Art Contemporani Barcelona; Barcelona, Spain
 1997. Selected Festivals. Group Shows
 Gothic: Transmutations of Horror in Late 20th Century Art, ICA; Boston, MA (traveled)
 MIX '97: NY Lesbian and Gay Experimental Film Festival; NY
 MIX '97: Mexico and MIX '97: Brazil (traveled)
 Kybernetes: Encuentro de Video y Electronicas; Bogotá, Colombia
 1996. One Person Shows
 Vermont College, MFA Program; Montpelier, VT (visiting artist)
 Cinema Studies Program, NYU; New York, NY
 Open Zone: Interactive Phenomena & Quicktime; Barcelona, Spain (traveled)
 1996. Selected Festivals. Group Shows
 Korper Und Sexualitat, deutsches filmmuseum; Frankfurt, Germany
 Cine Club at Anthology Film Archive; NY
 Danish Workshop Film Festival; Copenhagen, Denmark
 Slacker Attitude, London Electronic Arts; London, England (traveled)
 A Tribute to Squat Theater, Artists' Space; NY
 1995 Whitney Biennial Exhibition; NY (traveled)
 Statens Museum for Kunst; Copenhagen, Denmark
 1995. One Person Shows
 University of South Florida; Tampa, FL (visiting artist)
 The Films of Peggy Ahwesh, Pacific Film Archives; Berkeley, CA
 Odd and Original: Sexploitation Films by Doris Wishman, Roxy Theater & the Other Cinema; San Francisco, CA (curator)
 1995. Selected Festivals. Group Shows
 More Hysteria, Please!, Columbia University; NY
 (Lacanian Ink) Festival International du Nouveau Cinema et de la Video; Montreal, Canada
 Coming to Power: Xperimental Films by Women, Film Makers' Co-op; NY (traveled)
 San Francisco International Film Festival; San Francisco, CA
 1995 Biennial Exhibition, Whitney Museum of American Art; NY (traveled)
 Wellington and Auckland International Film Festivals; New Zealand
 1994. One Person Shows
 Harvard Film Archive, Carpenter Center for the Arts; Cambridge, MA (retrospective)
 American Museum of the Moving Image; Queens, NY
 Anthology Film Archives; New York, NY
 World Wide Video Festival; The Hague, The Netherlands
 1994. Selected Festivals. Group Shows
 Bad Girls, The New Museum; NY (w The Scary Movie)
 "Pixilvision: The Philosophical Toy", 3rd NY Video Festival; NY
 American Film Institute Video Festival; Los Angeles, CA
 Impakt Festival; Utrecht, The Netherlands
 Ex-Post Factory: After Warhol, Pacific Film Archive; Berkeley, CA
 Festival of Independents; Philadelphia
 PA MIX 94: NY Gay & Lesbian Experimental Film Festival; NY MIX '94 Brazil: Festival das Manifestacoes da Sexualidade, Brazil (traveled)
 Museum of Sound and Image; São Paulo, Brazil (traveled)
 Man Trouble, Exit Art; NY (curator Jason Simon)
 American Independence, Institute for Contemporary Art; London, England
 X-Rated Films by Women, Films Charas; New York
 1993. One Person Shows
 Video Premiers, Museum of Modern Art; NY (w Margie Strosser)
 Juger und Sammler: Die Neuen Nomaden, Eiszeit Kino; Berlin, Germany
 Strange Paradises, The Cinematheque; San Francisco, CA
 The Opium Den at The Pleasure Dome at Cine Cycle; Toronto, Canada
 1993. Selected Festivals. Group Shows
 New Directions in American AG (1981–91), London Film Co-op; England (traveled)
 Coming to Power: Xplicit Films by Women, David Zwerner Gallery; NY (traveled)
 Dallas Video Festival; Dallas, Texas
 Picturing Ritual, Center for Photography at Woodstock; Woodstock, NY
 1992. One Person Shows
 Sarah Lawrence College; Bronxville, NY sex/POSITIVE; Philadelphia, PA (conference/screening)
 University of Florida, a Critical Art Ensemble project; Tallahassee, FL
 Coming Soon, American Culture & Popular Culture Associations Annual Conference; Louisville, KY (w Keith Sanborn)
 1992. Selected Festivals . Group Shows
 Flaming and Other Creatures, Harvard Film Archive; Cambridge, MA
 Through Her Eyes: Women in Film and Video, The Learning Channel Eros and Thanatos, Woodstock Guild; Woodstock, NY
 The Travel and Leisure Show, 4 Walls; Brooklyn, NY
 1991. One Person Shows
 The Wexner Center; Columbus, OH Hallwalls Contemporary Arts Center; Buffalo, NY
 1991. Selected Festivals. Group Shows
 1991 Biennial, Whitney Museum of American Art; NY (traveled)
 "Return of Visual Pleasure", Whitney Museum of American Art; NY
 Films de Femmes Fest International de CrÈteil et du Marne; Creteil, France
 Ars Electronica Video Festival; Linz, Austria
 Reframing the Family, Artists Space; New York, NY
 Melbourne & Sidney International Film Festivals; Australia
 Al-Ismailiyah International Film Festival; Al-Ismailiyah, Egypt
 Pearls Before Swine, Eiszeit Kino; Berlin, Germany
 Nucleo dos Cineasates Independentes; Lisbon and O Porto, Portugal
 1990. One Person Shows
 Cineprobe, MoMA; NY
 The Carnegie Museum of Art; Pittsburgh, PA
 The Pittsburgh Filmmakers; Pittsburgh, PA
 In Bataille's Dark Chamber, The Collective for Living Cinema; NY (w Keith Sanborn)
 "Child", Kitchen Center for Video, Music & Performance; NY (panel/screening)
 Image Film and Video Center; Atlanta, GA
 Anti-Censorship Fest, Coalition for Freedom of Expression; Berkeley, CA
 The London International Film Festival; London, England
 The Pleasure Dome; Toronto, Canada
 1990. Selected Festivals. Group Shows
 Image World, Whitney Museum of American Art; NY
 A Passage Illuminated: American A/G Film 1980–90; Amsterdam, The Netherlands
 Festival de Nouveau Cinema; Montreal,
 Canada Independent Focus, WNET/CH 13; NY, NY
 Are You Now or Have You Ever Been. . ., Film in the Cities; Minneapolis, MN
 Opaque Projections: Childhood & Memory, LACE; Los Angeles, CA
 Sexual Politics: The Cutting Edge, Dartmouth College; Hanover, NH
 1989. One Person Shows
 In Bataille's Dark Chamber, Small Press Distribution Center; Berkeley (w Keith Sanborn)
 Old & New Masters of Super 8, Anthology Film Archives; NY
 The Collective for Living Cinema; New York Massachusetts College of Art; Boston, MA
 1989. Selected Festivals. Group Shows
 The Politics & Poetics of Sexuality, Feminism & Reproductive Freedom, Hall
 walls Breaking the Fall, Collective for Living Cinema; New York (curator Mark McElhatten)
 "The Body & Other Tales of Joy & Woe", Critical Art Ensemble Media Festival; Tallahassee, FL
 1987. One Person Shows
 Film Forum; Los Angeles, CA
 The Cinematheque; San Francisco, CA
 Super 8mm: The Last Frontier, Currier Gallery of Art; Manchester, NH
 1987. Selected Festivals. Group Shows
 Infermental: A Video Magazine; Buffalo, NY (curators Chris Hill & Peter Weibel) (traveled)
 Independent America, American Museum of the Moving Image; Queens, NY
 Speculum of the Other Woman, The Other Cinema; SF, CA
 Ann Arbor Super 8mm Film Festival; Ann Arbor, MI Super 8 Solar System, Artists Space; NY
 1984. One Person Shows
 Women's Caucus for Art, National Conference; Boston, MA
 Super 8 Motel, The Kitchen Center; NY Women in Film, William Penn Museum; Harrisburg, PA
 Eiszeit Kino; Berlin, Germany
 1984: Selected Festivals-Group Shows
 Ironic Naturalism, Hallwalls; Buffalo, NY (screening/panel)

Selected bibliography
 Ahwesh, Peggy. "Lara Croft: Tomb Raider." Film Comment 37 (July/August 2001) p 77.
 Arthur, Paul. "Bodies, Language and the Impeachment of Vision: American Avant-garde Film at 50" Persistence of Vision No. 11 (1995) CUNY
 Blaetz, Robin, ed. Women's Experimental Cinema: Critical Frameworks. Durham, NC: Duke University Press, 2008
 Dargis, Manohla. "On The Deadman." Artforum, 28 (May 1990) pp. 29–30.
 Gangitano, Lia. "Warhol's Grave", In Steve Reinke and Tom Taylor, ed. LUX: A Decade of Artists Film and Video. XYZ Books, Toronto (2000) pp. 306–11.
 Gorfinkel, Elena. "Arousal in Ruins: The Color of Love and the Haptic Object of Film History." World Picture 4. Spring 2010.
 Griffin, Tim. "Bury the Lead", World Art, no. 16 (1998) pp. 22 – 25.
 Gunning, Tom "Towards a Minor Cinema: Fonoroff, Herwitz, Ahwesh, Klahr, Lapore and Solomon" Motion Picture 3 (winter 89–90) pp 2–5.
 Handelman, Michelle. "Women's Studies" Filmmaker Magazine (Winter 2002) p 12.
 Hoberman, J. "Attack of the Mutants." The Village Voice 14 Mar. 2000: 115
 Iles, Chrissie "Biennial 2002 Exhibition Catalogue", Whitney Museum of American Art
 Jones, Kristin M. "Ahwesh at the Whitney." Artforum 36 (Nov 1997) pp. 118–119.
 Lewis, Jon, ed. The New American Cinema. Durham, NC: Duke University Press, 1998: 353-78
 Marks, Laura U. "Loving a Disappearing Image" Cinéma et Mélancolie Vol 8, no. 1–2, Québec (1999), pp 93–111.
 MacDonald, Scott, A Critical Cinema 5: Interviews with Independent Filmmakers, University of California Press, 2006.
 Russell, Catherine. "Culture as Fiction: The Ethnographic Impulse in the Films of Peggy Ahwesh, Su Friedrich, and Leslie Thornton." In Jon Lewis, ed. The New American Cinema. Durham & London: Duke University Press (1998) pp. 353–78.
 Smith, Gavin. "The Way of All Flesh." Film Comment 31 (July/August 1995) p. 18. Taubin, Amy. "Women on Top" The Village Voice (August 5, 1997) p. 74.
 Wees, William C. "The Color of Love and the Recycling of Pornography by Avant-Garde Filmmakers" FSAC Conference, Université Laval, May 2001. conference paper.
 Wees, William C. "Peggy's Playhouse: Contesting the Modernist Paradigm", Women's Experimental Cinema: Critical Frameworks, Ed. Robin Blaetz, Duke University Press, 2006.

Notes

References

External links
 Biography at Electronic Arts Intermix
 Interview, in Millennium Film Journal (MFJ No. 39/40, Winter 2003: Hidden Currents)
 Peggy Ahwesh, by John David Rhodes, in Senses of Cinema
 
 Peggy Ahwesh at the Video Data Bank
 Peggy Ahwesh at FELIX
 Peggy Ahwesh at [www.ubu.com/ Ubuweb]
 Peggy Ahwesh at [www.vimeo.com]/ Vimeo]
 Peggy Ahwesh at Brooklyn Museum
 Peggy Ahwesh at Bard College
 Peggy Ahwesh's UBUWeb entry

1954 births
Living people
American women experimental filmmakers
American experimental filmmakers
Antioch College alumni
American video artists
American women film directors
Artists from Pittsburgh
Bard College faculty
Feminist filmmakers
20th-century American women artists
20th-century American artists
21st-century American women artists
21st-century American artists
American women academics